In 1928, the New Zealand national rugby union team (the All Blacks) undertook a three-month tour of South Africa.
The series of four Test matches was drawn 2–2 and the overall tour record was sixteen wins, five losses and one draw.

Matches
Scores and results list New Zealand's points tally first.

Touring party

Manager:
Assistant manager:
Captain: Maurice Brownlie (Hawke's Bay)

Full-back
 Herb Lilburne (Canterbury)

Three-quarters
 Bert Grenside (Hawke's Bay)
 Alan Robilliard (Canterbury)
 Charlie Rushbrook (Wellington)
 Fred Lucas (Auckland)
 Sydney Carleton (Canterbury)

Half-backs
 David Lindsay (Otago)
 Toby Sheen (Auckland)
 Lance Johnson (Wellington)
 Neil McGregor (Canterbury) 
 Mark Nicholls (Wellington)
 Archie Strang (South Canterbury)
 Bill Dalley (Canterbury)
 Frank Kilby (Wellington)

Forwards
 Geoff Alley (Canterbury)
 Cyril Brownlie (Hawke's Bay)
 Maurice Brownlie (Hawke's Bay)
 Jim Burrows (Canterbury)
 Innes Finlayson (North Auckland)
 Swin Hadley (Auckland)
 Ian Harvey (Wairarapa)
 Bill Hazlett (Southland)
 John Hore (Otago)
 Ruben McWilliams (Auckland)
 George Scrimshaw (Canterbury)
 Eric Snow (Nelson)
 Ron Stewart (South Canterbury)
 John Swain (Hawkes Bay)
 Edward Ward (Taranaki)

External links
 1928 Tour in Details

All Black tour
New Zealand national rugby union team tours of South Africa
Rugby union tours of South Africa
Rugby union tour
Rugby union tours of Zimbabwe
1928 in South African rugby union